Daniel López Parada (born 21 January 1994 in A Coruña) is a Spanish cyclist, who currently rides for Spanish amateur team CC Cambre–Caeiro.

Major results
2017
 8th Clásica de Almería
 9th Vuelta a La Rioja
2018
 1st Stage 12 Tour of Qinghai Lake

References

External links

1994 births
Living people
Spanish male cyclists
Sportspeople from A Coruña
Cyclists from Galicia (Spain)